Yongding Road Subdistrict is a subdistrict situated on the south side of Haidian District, Beijing, China. It borders Tiancun Road Subdistrict in the north, Wanshou Road Subdistrict in the east and south, and Laoshan Subdistrict to the west. As of 2020, it had 90,879 people residing within it.

The subdistrict was created in June 1979, and its name came from Yongding Road that runs through it.

Administrative Divisions 
As of 2021, Yongding Road Subdistrict consisted of 25 communities:

See also 

 List of township-level divisions of Beijing

References 

Haidian District
Subdistricts of Beijing